The Los Angeles Organization of Ultimate Teams is the largest and most important ultimate frisbee organization in Southern California.  It oversees four adult leagues, a pickup program with more than 20 locations, and a youth frisbee program.  It has been covered in the Los Angeles Times  and mentioned in many other media outlets.  It is the home of several nationally recognized ultimate teams.  It is credited with expanding the Los Angeles ultimate scene to a new breadth.

Adult
In addition to winter, spring and summer leagues, the group runs a beach league and organizes the annual LeiOUT Beach Tournament (every January) in Santa Monica, California with over 1,000 adult participants.  The tournament draws participants from up and down the west coast.

Youth
The youth program oversees a parallel track at the LeiOUT Beach Tournament with separate divisions for middle school and high school students.  It also puts on a six-night overnight summer camp for youth.

References

Organizations based in Los Angeles
Ultimate (sport) organizations